White's Ford was an important ford over the Potomac River during the American Civil War. It was used in many major actions, including the crossing into Maryland of the Confederate army prior to the Maryland Campaign and  Confederate Major General J.E.B. Stuart's ride around Union Major General George B. McClellan on October 10, 1862, when he used the ford to cross into Loudoun County, Virginia. It is located a few miles above present-day White's Ferry.

The ford was named after Captain Elijah V. White, a Confederate cavalry officer and leader of the cavalry battalion known as the Comanches. His farm was on the Virginia side of the ford.

References
 Maryland Historical Marker

Crossings of the Potomac River
Loudoun County in the American Civil War